Chez nous (French for "with us") may refer to:

Chez nous (film), English title This Is Our Land, 2017 French-Belgian drama film directed by Lucas Belvaux
"Chez nous" (song), song by Dominique Walter, French entry to Eurovision Song Contest 1966
Chez Nous (TV series), Canadian children's television series which aired on CBC Television in 1957.
Chez Nous (Belgian party), a far-right Belgian political party.

See also
"Chez nous (Plan d'Aou, Air Bel)", 2017 song written by Jean-Jacques Goldman and sung by Patrick Fiori with Soprano from Fiori's 2017 album Promesse